Itsaso Leunda Goñi (born 3 March 1984) is a Spanish racing cyclist. She is the 2008 Spanish National Road Race Champion.

References

External links

1984 births
Living people
Spanish female cyclists
People from Tolosaldea
Sportspeople from Gipuzkoa
Cyclists from the Basque Country (autonomous community)